The Indiana Pacers have selected the following players in the National Basketball Association Draft.

References

 

 
National Basketball Association draft
draft history